Apac District is a district in the Northern Region of Uganda. The Town of Apac hosts the district headquarters.

Location
Apac District is bordered by Oyam District to the north-east, Kole District to the north, Lira District to the north-east, Dokolo District to the east, Amolatar District to the south, Nakasongola District to the south-west, and Kiryandongo District to the west.

Overview
Sub-counties Ngai, Iceme, Achaba, Minakulu, and Otwal were affected by the Lord's Resistance Army insurgency

In 2006, Apac District was split and part of it became Oyam District. In July 2010, it was further sub-divided to create Kole District.

Population
In 1991, the national population census estimated the district population at 162,200. The 2002 national census estimated the population at 249,700. The annual population growth rate in the district between 2002 and 2012 was 3.5 percent. It was estimated that the population in 2012 was 349,000.

Economic activities

Subsistence agriculture is the major economic activity in the district. An estimated 80 percent of the district's population is engaged in subsistence agriculture, although approximately 75 percent of the work is done by women.

Îimop
Some fishing is practiced in the south of the district, particularly from Lake Kwania, a component of the Lake Kyoga aquatic system. Fish farming is taking root in the district as well.

References

External links
Profile of Apac District

 
Districts of Uganda
Northern Region, Uganda